Château de Cherbourg was a castle in Cherbourg, Normandy, France.

A castle has existed at Cherbourg since the 10th century. The castle was besieged and captured by the French from the English garrison in 1450.

References
Stéphane William Gondoin. Les châteaux forts au temps de Guillaume le Conquérant. September 2015

Castles in Manche
Cherbourg-Octeville
Ruined castles in Normandy